The Ballad of Buster Scruggs is a 2018 American Western anthology film written, directed, and produced by the Coen brothers. It stars Tim Blake Nelson, Tyne Daly, James Franco, Brendan Gleeson, Bill Heck, Grainger Hines, Zoe Kazan, Harry Melling, Liam Neeson, Jonjo O'Neill, Chelcie Ross, Saul Rubinek, and Tom Waits, and features six vignettes that take place on the American frontier.

The film premiered at the 75th Venice International Film Festival on August 31, 2018, where it won the Golden Osella Award for Best Screenplay. After a limited theatrical run beginning on November 9, 2018, it was released on Netflix on November 16. The National Board of Review named it as one of its top ten best films of 2018. The film earned three nominations at the 91st Academy Awards: Best Adapted Screenplay, Best Costume Design and Best Original Song ("When a Cowboy Trades His Spurs for Wings").

Plot

"The Ballad of Buster Scruggs"
Buster Scruggs, a cheerful singing cowboy, arrives at an isolated cantina full of outlaws where he exchanges insults with another patron before effortlessly shooting everyone as they reach for their guns.

Buster then wanders into Frenchman's Gulch and enters a saloon, leaving his guns at the door to comply with its no firearms policy. He joins a game of poker that a player has suddenly left, but discovers the player vacated the seat after being dealt the infamous dead man's hand, which the other players insist Buster play now that he has seen the cards. When Buster refuses, a large menacing player named Joe stands and draws a concealed pistol. After failing to persuade Joe to end the confrontation, Buster repeatedly kicks a loose plank in the poker table, which tips Joe's gun hand so that his pistol points backwards and discharges into his face. Having shot himself three times, Joe falls dead. Buster breaks the barroom tension with a boisterous song about "Surly Joe", much to the patrons' delight. Joe's brother arrives in dismay and challenges Buster to a gunfight in the street. Buster gladly obliges and proceeds to shoot off each of the fingers of his right hand before finishing him off with the sixth shot delivered over-the-shoulder using a mirror.

A young singing cowboy clad in black then rides into town and politely challenges Buster. Buster again happily obliges, but much to his surprise, the young man is an even faster draw and shoots him through his forehead. Buster examines the wound in disbelief before collapsing, admitting via voice-over that he should have foreseen that "you can't be top dog forever." The young man and Buster then sing a bittersweet duet called "When A Cowboy Trades His Spurs For Wings" as Buster's spirit rises from his body and floats towards heaven, complete with angel wings and a lyre, and expressing hope of a place above where people are better than they are on Earth.

"Near Algodones"
A young cowboy robs an isolated bank in New Mexico. As he is fleeing, the jabbering bank teller shoots at him, forcing him to take cover behind a well. He returns fire, but the teller charges him while wearing a washboard and several pots and pans as armor, which deflect all the cowboy's bullets as the teller repeatedly cackles "Pan shot!" The teller knocks the cowboy out with the butt of his shotgun.

When the cowboy regains consciousness, he is sitting upon his horse under a tree with his hands tied and a noose around his neck. The leader of a posse asks for his final words, since they "convicted" him and sentenced him to death while he was semi-conscious. The execution is interrupted by ambushing Comanche warriors who quickly slaughter the posse but leave the cowboy in place upon the horse.

After a time, a drover happens by and frees the cowboy, who then joins him on his drive. However, the drover is actually a rustler, and they are promptly chased down by another posse. The drover escapes, but the posse captures the cowboy and takes him into town, where the judge summarily orders him to hang. As the cowboy stands upon the gallows with three other men awaiting execution, he looks at the man to his left, who is weeping and bemoaning his fate, and quips "first time?" The cowboy's eyes settle on a young woman in the crowd, then the hangman abruptly hoods him and pulls the trapdoor lever to cheers and applause.

"Meal Ticket"
An aging impresario and his artist Harrison, a young man with no arms or legs, travel from town to town in a wagon that converts into a small stage where Harrison theatrically recites classics such as Shelley's poem "Ozymandias"; the biblical story of Cain and Abel; works by Shakespeare, including Sonnet 29 and The Tempest; and Abraham Lincoln's Gettysburg Address. The impresario collects money from the audience at the end of each performance, but profits are dwindling as they visit increasingly remote mountain towns with smaller and more indifferent audiences.

Following a performance that yields no profit, the impresario observes a man nearby drawing a crowd with a chicken that can ostensibly perform basic arithmetic by pecking at painted numbers to answer addition and subtraction equations that the audience calls out. After buying the chicken, the impresario drives the wagon through a mountain pass and stops by a bridge over a rushing river. He walks to the center of the bridge and drops a large stone to gauge the water's depth before returning to the wagon. The impresario resumes driving the wagon, with the caged chicken as his only passenger.

"All Gold Canyon"
A grizzled prospector arrives in a pristine mountain valley and decides to dig for gold in a grassy meadow beside a river. Over the course of several days, he pans through shovelfuls of dirt to count the gold specks, then begins digging a deeper hole once he has triangulated the likely source. After his first night camping, he spots an owl tending its treetop nest. When he climbs up and reaches the nest, the owl’s watchful gaze from a nearby tree causes him to replace three of the four eggs he had taken for his breakfast.

On his third day, he digs out gold nuggets of increasing size before finally reaching "Mr. Pocket", a large gold vein running through the quartz he has uncovered. No sooner has he made his discovery than a young man who has been trailing the prospector and letting him do all the work sneaks up to the edge of the hole. He shoots the prospector in the back and the prospector falls face down. When the young man jumps into the hole to steal the gold, the prospector stops feigning death, wrestles the young man's gun away, and kills him. The prospector cleans and assesses his wound in the stream, confirming it is not lethal. He finishes mining the gold, buries the young man's body in the same hole, and departs the valley.

"The Gal Who Got Rattled"
Alice Longabaugh and her older brother Gilbert, an inept businessman, are journeying in a wagon train across the prairie towards Oregon, where Gilbert claims a new business partner will marry his sister. Gilbert has a violent coughing fit and dies shortly after they embark. The wagon train's leaders, Mr. Billy Knapp and Mr. Arthur, attribute Gilbert's death to cholera and help Alice bury him.

Though she has no definite prospects in Oregon, Alice decides to continue the trip rather than return east. Matt, the young man Gilbert hired to lead their wagon, claims Gilbert promised him a higher-than-usual wage of $400, half of which he expects when they reach the halfway point at Fort Laramie. Fearing Gilbert's money was buried with him, Alice conveys her predicament to Billy, who offers his support in contemplating how to proceed. He also does Alice the favor of first attempting to shoot Gilbert's small dog, President Pierce (named after Franklin Pierce), then scaring him off, because the dog's constant barking has drawn widespread complaint.

Through the course of their conversations, Billy grows fond of Alice. He proposes to solve her dilemma by marrying her in Fort Laramie, assuming Gilbert's debt to Matt, and retiring from leading wagon trains to build a home and family with her upon the 640 acres in Oregon that he can claim according to the Homestead Act. Alice is surprised by Billy's proposal, but has grown fond of him, so she accepts. Billy informs Mr. Arthur that this will be their last ride together.

The following morning, Mr. Arthur notices Alice missing. He rides over a nearby hill to find her reunited with President Pierce and laughing as he barks at the antics of some prairie dogs. Mr. Arthur then spots a Native American scout and advancing war party. Preparing for a fight, he gives Alice a pistol so that if he is killed, she can shoot herself and avoid capture. Mr. Arthur twice drives back the charging warriors with his rifle, but a remaining warrior momentarily appears to kill him. He kills the warrior, then discovers that when he appeared to have died, Alice shot herself as he had instructed. Mr. Arthur sadly walks back to the wagon train with President Pierce, unsure of what to say to Billy Knapp.

"The Mortal Remains"
At sunset, five people, an Englishman (Thigpen), an Irishman (Clarence), a Frenchman (René), a lady (Mrs. Betjeman), and a fur trapper ride to Fort Morgan, Colorado, in a stagecoach. Thigpen says that he and Clarence often travel this route "ferrying cargo", alluding to a corpse on the roof, but he does not specify the nature of their business.

The Trapper rambles about his past relationship with a Hunkpapa woman in which neither knew the other's language, but communicating through understanding each other's emotions led him to conclude that people are all alike in their basic needs, just like the animals he traps. Mrs. Betjeman, a devout Christian, indignantly retorts that there are only two kinds of people, upright and sinning, and explains that she knows this because her husband, whom she is traveling to meet after having been apart for three years, is a retired Chautauqua lecturer on "moral and spiritual hygiene." René challenges her dichotomy and the trapper's oversimplification with reflections on the unique and subjective nature of human experiences. As an example, René questions whether Mr. Betjeman conceives of love the same way Mrs. Betjeman does, conjecturing that if he does not, perhaps he has not remained faithful to her during their separation.

Mrs. Betjeman becomes apoplectic, and René calls out the window for the coach to be stopped, but the driver does not halt. Thigpen explains that the stage company's policy is not to stop for any reason. Clarence sings the bittersweet folk song "The Unfortunate Lad", which calms Mrs. Betjeman. He and Thigpen then reveal themselves to be "reapers", or bounty hunters. Thigpen tells the group that their usual method is for him to distract their targets with stories while Clarence "thumps" them. Thigpen remarks that he enjoys watching them die, especially the expression in their eyes as they "negotiate the passage" and "try to make sense of it."

The other three are visibly unsettled by this as they arrive at the dark and foreboding hotel in Fort Morgan where they will all be staying. They remain in the stagecoach while Thigpen and Clarence carry the corpse into the hotel and up its stairway, which is brightly lit from above by a white light. They then slowly disembark, and the coach departs without any luggage being unloaded. Mrs. Betjeman and the trapper warily make their own way through the hotel door. René pauses to watch the coachman set off, then sets his top hat at a jaunty angle and enters with an air of amused resignation, closing the doors behind him.

Cast

Music
The film uses music and song in every segment, sometimes as part of the action and sometimes as incidental music.
 "Cool Water", written by Bob Nolan, performed by Tim Blake Nelson
 "Randall Collins", written by Norman Blake
 "Surly Joe the Gambler", performed by Tim Blake Nelson
 "Carefree Drifter", written by David Rawlings and Gillian Welch
 "When a Cowboy Trades His Spurs for Wings", written by David Rawlings and Gillian Welch, performed by Tim Blake Nelson and Willie Watson
 "Weela Weela Walya", traditional, performed by Liam Neeson
 "The Sash My Father Wore", traditional, performed by Liam Neeson
 "Under the Double Eagle", written by Josef Franz Wagner
 "Mother Machree", written by Rida Johnson Young, Chauncey Olcott and Ernest Ball, performed by Tom Waits
 "La Ricciola", traditional, arranged by Gabe Witcher
 "Has Anybody Here Seen Kelly?", written by C.W. Murphy (as Clarence W. Murphy) and Will Letters, performed by Jonjo O'Neill
 "Campfire Fiddle", written by Gabe Witcher
 "The Unfortunate Lad", traditional, performed by Brendan Gleeson

Production
Joel and Ethan Coen announced The Ballad of Buster Scruggs in January 2017 as a collaboration with Annapurna Television. In August 2017, Netflix announced it would stream the work worldwide.

The film was based on Western-themed short stories, some of which were written by the Coens over a period of 20 to 25 years (accounts vary) that vary in mood and subject. Tim Blake Nelson was given the script for the eponymous story in 2002 and told that a second, "Meal Ticket", was in outline form, but only heard in 2016 that the project would commence production. "All Gold Canyon" follows a Jack London story by the same name. "The Gal Who Got Rattled" was inspired by a story by Stewart Edward White, and is based in part on contemporaneous accounts, including those of heated arguments over pets. While some reports claimed the work would be a six-part television series, the Coens intended the stories to be seen together, structured them that way in the script they submitted to Annapurna, and shot the script as written.

Throughout 2017 and into the start of 2018, James Franco, Zoe Kazan, Tyne Daly, Willie Watson, Ralph Ineson, Tim Blake Nelson, Stephen Root, Liam Neeson and Brendan Gleeson joined the cast.

The Ballad of Buster Scruggs was the Coens' first film to be shot digitally. The filmmakers saw the project, with its 800 visual effects and late magic hour shoots, as a good opportunity to experiment with the medium. Cinematographer Bruno Delbonnel employed a 1.85:1 aspect ratio and used a 27mm lens for the majority of the shots. "The Gal Who Got Rattled" was shot on private land north of Mitchell in the Nebraska Panhandle, with a casting call for "ordinary" Nebraskans to appear as extras. In New Mexico, "The Ballad of Buster Scruggs" and "Near Algodones" were shot on location; "The Mortal Remains" was shot entirely on a sound stage. "The Meal Ticket" and "All Gold Canyon" were shot in Colorado, the latter in Telluride.

Joel Coen said the shoot was physically demanding: exterior shots with uncovered sets, "really brutal weather" and much travel over wide-ranging locations. "It wouldn’t have hurt if we were younger." The long wagon train in "The Gal Who Got Rattled" proved especially challenging because of the difficulty of coordinating the oxen teams for timing and direction. Fourteen wagons were built from scratch in a New Mexico blacksmith shop, and then shipped in pairs on flatbed trailers to the shooting location in Nebraska. Their design was influenced by the 1930 film The Big Trail. Most of the costumes were handmade for the production. Designer Mary Zophres credited historical reenactment supply companies for carrying hard-to-find period fabrics, noting that U.S. wool production, at the time of filming, was "practically nil".

Funding and distribution
From the outset, the Coens ruled out traditional film studio funding, seeing an industry shift in how smaller projects are financed. Joel Coen said that Netflix was investing in movies that are not based on Marvel Comics or other established action franchises, "which is pretty much the business of the studios now." The filmmakers had mixed feelings regarding Netflix distribution as The Ballad of Buster Scruggs was given only a limited theatrical run before its Netflix streaming debut. The Coens credited home video with helping establish their own careers and admitted that they succumbed to the temptation to watch movie screeners at home rather than going out to a theater; but the "hours and days and years you spend struggling over details" of a film "is appreciated in a different way on a big screen," Joel Coen said.

Netflix funding was also the reason composer Carter Burwell conducted his score, with up to 40 musicians, at Abbey Road Studios in London, which, he noted, is ironic given that the film is an American Western. "In this case, Netflix as a distributor is not a signatory to any of the union agreements here. So they wanted to go to London so they wouldn't be involved in that. I mention that because more and more films are being made by companies that aren't signatories." He said that the issue has festered over the past 20 years, to the point where the film score recording business has disappeared from New York with no prospect of being rebuilt.

Reception

Box office
Although Netflix does not disclose box office results, IndieWire tracked reserved online seating sales and deduced The Ballad of Buster Scruggs made $6,600 on its first day from its Los Angeles and New York City locations. It then estimated the film made about $36,000 in its opening weekend, for a four-day total of around $45,000. Had the results been made official, the debut per-venue estimates of $12,000 would have ranked as the lowest of the Coen Brothers' career. IndieWire estimated that the opening exceeded most Netflix releases and noted that, for the distributor, "getting people to see their films in theaters is not the point."

Critical response
The website's critical consensus reads, "The Ballad of Buster Scruggs avoids anthology pitfalls with a consistent collection tied together by the Coen brothers' signature blend of dark drama and black humor." On Metacritic, the film has a weighted average score of 79 out of 100, based on 48 critics, indicating "generally favorable reviews".

Critic Matt Zoller Seitz admired the film, with high praise especially given to the "Buster Scruggs" vignette, stating that it "captures the contradictions of American mythology better than any full-length revisionist western I've seen. Joyous, optimistic, confident fable-making, in service of machismo and homicide." Seitz added that "Buster is also (incidentally) US military policy, seeking out and often escalating threats in order to demonstrate his awesome killing prowess, then retroactively justifying it, even singing his own songs of glory and goodness."

Accolades

Notes

References

External links
  on Netflix
 
 

2018 films
2018 Western (genre) films
2010s American films
2010s English-language films
American anthology films
American Western (genre) films
Annapurna Pictures films
English-language Netflix original films
Films about death
Films based on works by Jack London
Films directed by the Coen brothers
Films produced by Megan Ellison
Films scored by Carter Burwell
Films set in Colorado
Films set in New Mexico
Films set in Wyoming
Films shot in Colorado
Films shot in Nebraska
Films shot in New Mexico